Kristína Saalová (born May 20, 1991 in Banská Bystrica, Slovakia) is an alpine skier from Slovakia. She competed for Slovakia at the 2014 Winter Olympics in the alpine skiing events.

References

1991 births
Living people
Olympic alpine skiers of Slovakia
Alpine skiers at the 2014 Winter Olympics
Sportspeople from Banská Bystrica
Slovak female alpine skiers
Competitors at the 2015 Winter Universiade